A'bunadh is a cask-strength single malt whisky from the Aberlour Distillery in Scotland.  Though it has no age statement, it is released in limited run batches, each batch carrying a unique number on its label. Each batch of this whisky is blended from barrels ranging from 5 to 25 years old.

A'bunadh is exclusively aged in Spanish oak Oloroso sherry butts and therefore has a sweeter, softer flavour than most scotch. A'bunadh is not chill filtered.

The distillery cite the story during distillery tours that when the second pair of stills were put in during 1975, a time capsule was discovered behind the name plate, containing an 1898 newspaper about the distillery fire wrapped around an 1898 bottle of Aberlour. The workmen who discovered the bottle polished off four fifths of the bottle during their lunch break, but the remains of the bottle went off to the laboratories in Keith, Moray, and were analysed. A'bunadh is an attempt to recreate this single malt.

Released batch numbers

References

Moray
Scottish malt whisky
Cask strength